Nemoura is a genus of spring stoneflies in the family Nemouridae. There are more than 190 described species in Nemoura.

See also
 List of Nemoura species

References

Further reading

External links

 

Nemouridae
Articles created by Qbugbot